The Institutional Democratic Party (PDI) is a minor Christian-democratic and nationalist political party in the Dominican Republic. It was founded in 1986 by Ismael Reyes Cruz.

References

External links
Official website

Political parties in the Dominican Republic